Cibubur is one of the five administrative villages (kelurahan) in Ciracas district  (kecamatan) in East Jakarta, Jakarta, the capital of Indonesia.
  Cibubur is located in a strategic location, because it is between Jalan Raya Bogor and the Jonggol area. Cibubur is the site of an SOS Children's Village.

Recreational Places
 Bumi Perkemahan dan Graha Wisata Pramuka (Buperta), a national Scouting center composed of camping grounds and other various recreational sites intended for activities ranging from elementary school level to nationwide Jamborees.
 Taman Bunga Wiladatika
 Hutan Kota Cibubur

References

External links 
Cibubur.Com - Media Informasi & Interaksi Komunitas Cibubur
 http://www.citralandcibubur.com/
 https://web.archive.org/web/20190430224659/https://www.rianaproperty.com/tag/perumahan-timur-cibubur/

East Jakarta